Malcolm McLean may refer to:

 Malcom McLean (1913–2001), American businessman
 Malcolm McLean (politician) (1883–1942), member of the Canadian House of Commons

See also
 Malcolm Maclean (disambiguation)